Sandy Senn (born June 27, 1963) is an American politician. She is a member of the South Carolina Senate from the 41st District, serving since 2016. She is a member of the Republican party.

References

Living people
1963 births
Republican Party South Carolina state senators
21st-century American politicians
People from Orangeburg, South Carolina
University of South Carolina School of Law alumni
21st-century American women politicians
Women state legislators in South Carolina

Women in the South Carolina State Senate